Gulbergaunet stadion is an association football venue in Steinkjer, Norway.

The record attendance through all times is 13,997 when the home team, Steinkjer FK played against Lyn (and lost 1–0) in the Norwegian Football Cup semi final 1970. The venue hosted the Norwegian Athletics Championships in 1978 and 2000. In 2003, the field was rebuilt with artificial turf.

References

Eksterne lenker 

 Guldbergaunet Stadion - Nordic Stadiums

Football venues in Norway
Eliteserien venues
Sports venues in Trøndelag
Steinkjer
Steinkjer FK